The International Journal of Constitutional Law is a quarterly law journal covering constitutional law, administrative law, international law, and other branches of public law. It was established in 2003 by Norman Dorsen from the New York University School of Law. While originally only available in English, the journal now also publishes issues in Spanish.

The journal is published by Oxford University Press and the editors-in-chief are Gráinne de Búrca and Joseph H. H. Weiler (New York University Law School). According to the Journal Citation Reports, the journal has a 2020 impact factor of 1.090.

See also
European Journal of International Law
German Law Journal
 List of law journals

References

External links

International law journals
Constitutional law journals
Publications established in 2003
Quarterly journals
Multilingual journals
Oxford University Press academic journals